The Margaret River Pro 2019 is an event of the Association of Surfing Professionals for the 2019 World Surf League.

This event was held from 29 May to 9 June at Margaret River, (Western Australia, Australia) and contested by 18 surfers.

Seeding Round

Elimination round

Round of 16

Quarter finals

Semi finals

Final

References

2019 World Surf League
Margaret River Pro
2019 in Australian women's sport
Sports competitions in Western Australia
Margaret River, Western Australia
Women's surfing